Elections for the Legislative Council were held in Cape Colony in 1903. Following Act 4 in 1904, a further three seats were added to the Council, for which elections were held in the same year.

Thirty-two candidates contested the 26 seats, although the three seats in the North Eastern Province, as well as the single seats for Griqualand West and British Bechauanaland were uncontested as only one candidate ran for east seat. A total of 135,177 voters were registered for the election.

Statistics

References

Cape
Elections in the Cape Colony
Parliamentary election